NS23, NS 23, NS-23, NS.23, or variation, may refer to:

Places
 Somerset MRT station (station code: NS23), Orchard, Singapore; a mass transit station
 Glace Bay-Dominion (constituency N.S. 23), Nova Scotia, Canada; a provincial electoral district

Other uses
 Nudelman-Suranov NS-23, a 23mm Soviet aircraft autocannon
 New Penguin Shakespeare volume 23
 Blue Origin NS-23, a suborbital spaceflight by the New Shepard

See also

 NS (disambiguation)
 23 (disambiguation)

Disambiguation pages